In the run up to the 2012 parliamentary elections in Serbia, various organisations carried out opinion polling to gauge voting intention in Serbia. The results of these polls are displayed in this article.

The date range for these opinion polls range from the previous parliamentary election, held on 11 May 2008, to the 2012 election, held on 6 May 2012. Most opinion polls predicted that the SNS had overtaken the ruling DS in 2010.



Graphical summary

Party vote

Poll results are listed in the tables below in reverse chronological order, showing the most recent first, and using the date the survey's fieldwork was done, as opposed to the date of publication. If such date is unknown, the date of publication is given instead. The highest percentage figure in each polling survey is displayed in bold, and the background shaded in the leading party's colour. In the instance that there is a tie, then no figure is shaded. The lead column on the right shows the percentage-point difference between the two parties with the highest figures. When a specific poll does not show a data figure for a party, the party's cell corresponding to that poll is shown empty.

Some long-standing coalitions implicitly included in several parties' ratings.

Notes

Serbia
2014